Necromania: Trap of Darkness is a Role-playing video game developed by the Slovakian developer Darksoft Game Development Studio and the Czech company Cinemax. It was released in 2002 in Russia and later worldwide. The player can choose one of Ragnar's minions that he wants to play as.

Plot 
Dark lord Ragnar and the ruler of Necromania was defeated and imprisoned by the army of the Absurdian king Bill Cocoton. Seven of his servants wake up and go to find magic keys that can set him free. But only one of them can lead the army of darkness.

Reception 
The game was received poorly by critics. It was mostly criticised for its gameplay and notable difficulty. Some reviews praised its multiplayer mode but found it difficult to find anyone to play with.

Neither players received the game well. The average rating of the game by players is 40%.

References 

Role-playing video games
Windows games
Windows-only games
Video games developed in the Czech Republic
Video games developed in Slovakia
2002 video games